Francisco Javier Torres Zamora (born 12 May 1983) is a Mexican former footballer who last played for Lobos BUAP of Liga MX.

Torres was born in León, Guanajuato. He made his debut against La Piedad, in a semifinal match in which he played three minutes. Torres got his first start against Pachuca in the first game of the Clausura 2003. In his third game as a professional soccer player, Torres scored a spectacular goal against Chivas which tied the game 1–1. The following season, Leo Beenhakker became the new coach of Club América and he relegated Torres. He did not play a single minute. Clausura 2004 was not much better as Torres only made 2 appearances for a total of 33 minutes.

Apertura 2004 brought a new hope for Torres. Leo Beenhakker had been sacked and Oscar Ruggeri became the new coach. Torres immediately began playing and scored the winning goal in the first game of the season against Dorados de Sinaloa. Torres appeared a total of 15 times but did not score again. Even though his playing time decreased during the Clausura 2005 season, he responded during the playoffs when teammate Óscar Rojas was unable to play. Torres scored an important goal in the semifinals against Cruz Azul and helped Club América win their 10th championship.

Prior to the Apertura 2006 season, Torres was traded to Santos Laguna in a deal that brought Argentinian goalscorer Vicente Matías Vuoso to América.

External links
 
 
 
 

1983 births
Living people
Footballers from Guanajuato
Sportspeople from León, Guanajuato
Club América footballers
Santos Laguna footballers
Liga MX players
Chiapas F.C. footballers
Atlas F.C. footballers
Atlético Morelia players
Club Puebla players
Mexico youth international footballers
Mexico under-20 international footballers
Mexico international footballers
Association football midfielders
Mexican footballers